Cornerstone Fellowship is a local, non-denominational, multi-site Christian, church serving the East Bay. Originating from Livermore, California, its Lead Pastor is Steve Madsen, who founded the church in his own home from a Bible study group.

Cornerstone Fellowship was established in 1992. It currently has five physical locations: one in Livermore, one in Brentwood, another in Hayward, then one in Walnut Creek, and one in Danville, California. They also stream services online with a live chat at live.cornerstoneweb.org Saturdays at 5pm and Sundays at 9am & 11am. Every week, about 10,000 people join one of their services either in person or online.

History
The Cornerstone Fellowship started when Steve Madsen started his own Bible Study in his House in 1992 after resigning from a Church. His first study was the book of Galatians. Then, at the same of year, the group organized itself into a church.

Cornerstone Fellowship met in a rented hall, going from one, to two, to eventually three services. At that time a former indoor soccer facility, across from a local Costco that had previously been refused was offered at half the previous price. In 2004, the church purchased the building and converted it into a 24,000 square feet facility. it was currently the largest venue in the Tri-Valley, two-thirds of the flagship building is for Kids ministries. In 2008, Cornerstone Fellowship launched its campus in Brentwood, with a goal to continue expanding its Livermore campus. However, in 2011, its focus shifted to create a network of locations rather than one large central campus. According to Collin Lucas, the CFO at the time, the goal was to simplify and home in on making disciples for Jesus.

On 24 March 2018, the new Brentwood building was set to open for the church community to use. The previous Brentwood location was Freedom High School (Oakley, California).

In January 2016, Cornerstone Fellowship launched a Walnut Creek location by merging with an existing struggling church named Life-Gate. The Life-Gate church senior pastor, Jeff Maitlen, joined the Walnut Creek team. Life-Gate had reached out to Cornerstone Fellowship before in order to "talk about options". CF's goal is to raise funds in order to fix up the "tired" building and to find a permanent location for the Hayward congregation.

Community, activities, and care 
CF Brentwood referenced a 10-week course "Equip to Care" led by professional counselors. On February 2, 2020, the Livermore location hosted an event fundraiser to provide for the housing, mental care, school, and medical needs for children. Cornerstone Fellowship also has a Missing Man Ministry which is there to support a window after the "sudden, heartbreaking loss of their husbands".

On February 10, 2017 CF held a free Night to Shine Prom at the Alameda County Fairgrounds.
On February 7, 2020 with the San Ramon and Walnut Creek locations, Cornerstone Fellowship hosted another free Night to Shine Prom for those with special needs. In partnership with Walnut Creek Presbyterian Church, CF organized the event and contributed to 250 volunteers for their local event. Cornerstone Fellowship has also partnered with other churches to be a Livermore homeless refuge and has set up a closet that provides clean underwear, socks, and clothes for the refuge.

Response to COVID-19 and church online 
In a response to the Coronavirus, Executive Pastor Chris Stockhaus, announced that Cornerstone Fellowship was moving its physical services temporarily to their existing Church Online platform, emphasizing that it was not a caving in to hysteria or pressure, but to care for the health of the community, specifically the elderly. The response was to move services to their Church Online platform, hosted by Life.Church, rather than to cancel. A separate students page was setup to cater specifically to the students at Cornerstone Fellowship from all campuses.

Charitable giving 
Cornerstone Fellowship gave a total of $1.5 million in 2018 to local and global non-profits, charities, outreach, and ministries. One of their goals is to get to a point where entire weekends are dedicated so that 100% of any income goes straight out the doors.

In response to the 2010 Haiti earthquake, Cornerstone Fellowship sent a contractor, Balch, to help rebuild the community.

Locations 
As of 2022, Cornerstone Fellowship has five physical locations.

Mission, values, and beliefs

Cornerstone Fellowship states that their objective is to help their followers take their next step with Jesus and their vision is to repair the fabric of the East Bay. They accomplish this through their multi-site model and online church presence. 

The Church's core values are Outreach, Generosity, Community, Care, and Equipping.

Their Statement of Faith lists beliefs including:
Trinity: God eternally is existent in three persons, co-equal and co-eternal.
Biblical inspiration: That the Bible is the written Word of God to humans. Humans wrote it, under the guidance of the Holy Spirit. 
Image of God (Imago Dei): Humans are created in the spiritual image of God, to be like God in character.
Eternity: People were created to exist forever
Church: The universal church is the spiritual body of believers with Christ as the head, and that many different denominations within the universal church worship Jesus Christ.

Cornerstone Fellowship states that, on non-essential beliefs, there is liberty. They state that these beliefs do not prevent salvation.

During the You Asked For It, Cornerstone Fellowship presented three different Genesis 1 views that are non-essential beliefs, stating that the controversy comes with understanding the context of how these verses should be interpreted. The first is a literal six-day reading, Young Earth creationism. The second is Old Earth Creationism, where God created things by instantaneous command, but which occurred over long periods of time. Lastly, is the third view of Evolutionary Creationism, or theistic evolution, where God guided and continues to guide the process of evolution, as He does with the rest of the Universe and laws of natures, and makes the distinction between the non-theistic Philosophy of science component of evolution.

References

External links 
 

Churches in California
21st-century churches in the United States
Churches in Alameda County, California
Livermore, California